The Pittsburgh CrosseFire were a member of the National Lacrosse League during the 2000 NLL season. They were based in Pittsburgh, Pennsylvania. The franchise started out as the Baltimore Thunder before moving to Pittsburgh. After a single season, they moved again to Washington, becoming the Washington Power. After two years in Washington, they moved west to Denver, becoming the Colorado Mammoth.

All time Record

References

Defunct National Lacrosse League teams
CrosseFire
Lacrosse teams in Pennsylvania
2000 establishments in Pennsylvania
2000 disestablishments in Pennsylvania